Radovan Božin (born May 4, 1940 in Novi Sad) is a Yugoslav sprint canoer who competed in the 1960s. He was eliminated in the semifinal round of the K-2 1000 m event at the 1960 Summer Olympics in Rome.

References
Sports-reference.com profile

1940 births
Canoeists at the 1960 Summer Olympics
Living people
Olympic canoeists of Yugoslavia
Yugoslav male canoeists
Serbian male canoeists
Sportspeople from Novi Sad